The Albanian revolt of 1912 ("Uprising of 1912"), also known as the Albanian War of Independence, was the last revolt against the Ottoman Empire's rule in Albania and lasted from January until August 1912. The revolt ended when the Ottoman government agreed to fulfill the rebels' demands on 4 September 1912. Generally, Muslim Albanians fought against the Ottomans in the incoming Balkan War.

Prelude 

The main reasons for all these revolts were changes for Albanians introduced by Young Turks, including tax increases, conscription for Albanians in the Ottoman army, and the disarming of the Albanian civil population.

Albanians were not the only group to start a rebellion against the Young Turks government. There were insurgencies in Syria and on the Arab peninsula.

The first major Albanian revolt in 1910 led by Isa Boletini and Idriz Seferi was supported by Bulgaria and Montenegro.
After two weeks of fierce fighting the Albanian rebels und Isa Boletini withdrew to the Drenicë region,while Idriz Seferi withdrew with his remaining soldiers to the Karadak region, where he continued his resistance. Sultan Mehmed V visited Pristina in June 1911 and declared an amnesty for all of those who had participated in the revolt, except for the ones who had committed murder. In order to calm the situation, the sultan introduced a number of concessions, including:
 The establishment of Albanian schools.
 Military service is to be restricted to the territory of Kosovo Vilayet.
 Suspension of all conscription and taxes for two years.
 Appointment of government officials who speak the Albanian language.

At the end of 1911 a group of Albanian Members, led by Ismail Qemali, started a debate in the Ottoman parliament. They requested additional rights for Albanians in the cultural and administrative spheres.

In January 1912, Hasan Prishtina, an Albanian deputy in the Ottoman parliament, publicly warned Members that the policy of the Young Turks' government would lead to a revolution in Albania. After that speech Ismail Qemali proposed a meeting with Hasan Prishtina. They met the same evening in the house of Hasan Prishtina and agreed to organize an Albanian uprising. The following day they met in the Pera Palace Hotel in Istanbul with Mufid Bey Libohova, Essad Pasha Toptani, Aziz Pasha Vrioni and Syreja Bey Vlora. They agreed to unite their organizations and lead the Albanian uprising. Subsequently they took an oath on this promise at a meeting in Syreja Bey's house in Taxim.

Events 
Since the participation of Kosovo played a central role in the uprising, it was decided that Ismail Qemali should organize the delivery of 15,000 Mauser rifles to Kosovo via the Kingdom of Montenegro. Hassan Prishtina attempted to get the support of Bulgaria by proposing the creation of an Albanian—Macedonian state to Pavlof, the Bulgarian deputy, who met him in the British Consulate in Skopje. The British Consul from Skopje promised that the United Kingdom would  provide strong support to the Albanians.

The revolt started in the western part of Kosovo Vilayet and was led by Hasan Pristina, Nexhip Draga, Bajram Curri, Riza bej Gjakova and others. Hasan Prishtina who was in the Kosovo Vilayet during the revolt, and Ismail Qemali who was in Europe gathering weapons and money and attempting to win over European public opinion to the cause of the uprising, maintained communication through the British Consulate in Skopje. Essad Pasha Toptani obliged himself to organize the uprising in Central Albania and Mirdita.

Albanian soldiers and officers deserted the Ottoman military service and joined the insurgents.

List of demands 
The Albanian rebels in Kosovo Vilayet demanded a number of actions from the Young Turk administration. These demands were printed in emigrant newspapers published in Bulgaria in the middle of March 1912, including the appointment of Albanians in government administration, schools with Albanian as the medium of instruction, and the restriction of Albanians' conscription in the Ottoman Army to the Kosovo Vilayet.

Albanian rebels were divided; some supported the Young Turk government, others the Liberal Union, while some even wished to return to Abdul Hamid's autocracy.

On 9 August 1912, Albanian rebels presented a new list of demands (the so-called list of Fourteen Points), related to the Albanian Vilayet, that can be summarized as follows:
 an autonomous system of administration and justice in four vilayets populated with Albanians (Albanian Vilayet),
 Albanians to perform military service only in the four principally-Albanian vilayets, except in time of war,
 employment of officials who knew local language and customs (though not necessarily Albanians),
 new lycées and agricultural schools in the bigger districts,
 reorganization and modernization of the religious schools and the use of the Albanian language in secular schools,
 freedom to establish private schools and societies,
 the development of trade, agriculture and public works,
 general amnesty for all the Albanians involved in the revolt,
 court martial of those Ottoman officers who had attempted to suppress the revolt.

The Ottoman government ended the Albanian revolts by accepting all demands (ignoring only the last) on 4 September 1912. Hasan Prishtina was planning to start a new revolt in three or four months, but the First Balkan War broke out soon and destroyed his plans.

Aftermath 

The success of the Albanian Revolt and news from the Italo-Turkish War sent a strong signal to the neighboring countries that the Ottoman Empire was weak. The members of the Balkan League decided that they could not waste such a golden opportunity to strike at a weakened Ottoman state. Demonstration of the weakness of the Ottoman Empire and promises of Albanian autonomy threatened Serbian ambitions for the incorporation of these territories into its domain. The Kingdom of Serbia opposed the plan for this rather large Albanian state (whose territories are now considered to be the concept of Greater Albania), preferring a partition of the European territory of the Ottoman Empire among the four Balkan allies.

See also 
 Hasan Prishtina
 Isa Boletini
 Albanian Revolt of 1910
 First Balkan War
 Albanian historiography

References

Further reading 
 
 
 

 

Military history of Albania
1912
Battles involving Albania
Conflicts in 1912
20th-century rebellions
20th century in Skopje
1912 in Albania
1912 in the Ottoman Empire
Albanian Question